Ḍal or ḍāl is a letter of the extended Arabic alphabet, derived from dāl by placing a small t̤oʾe (historically four dots in a square pattern) on top. It is not used in the Arabic alphabet itself, but is used to represent a voiced retroflex plosive [ɖ] in Urdu, Punjabi written in the Shahmukhi script, and Kashmiri as well as Balochi. The small t̤oʾe diacritic is used to indicate a retroflex consonant in Urdu. It is the twelfth letter of the Urdu alphabet. Its Abjad value is considered to be 4. In Urdu, this letter may also be called dāl-e-musaqqalā ("heavy dal") or dāl-e-hindiyā ("Indian dal"). In Devanagari, this consonant is rendered using ‘ड’.

Character encoding

References

Arabic letters